St. Joseph's Cove may refer to:
St. Joseph's Cove-St. Veronica's, Newfoundland and Labrador Bay D'Espoir
St. Joseph's Cove, Bonne Bay, Newfoundland and Labrador